Massimiliano Napolitano (born 13 March 1973) is an Italian racing cyclist. He rode in the 1999 Tour de France.

References

External links
 

1973 births
Living people
Italian male cyclists
Place of birth missing (living people)
People from Vittoria, Sicily
Sportspeople from the Province of Ragusa
Cyclists from Sicily